Algernon George Percy, 6th Duke of Northumberland,  (20 May 1810 – 2 January 1899), styled Lord Lovaine between 1830 and 1865 and Earl Percy between 1865 and 1867, was a British Conservative politician. He held office under the Earl of Derby as Paymaster-General and Vice-President of the Board of Trade in 1859 and under Benjamin Disraeli as Lord Privy Seal between 1878 and 1880.

Background
Northumberland was the eldest son of George Percy, Lord Lovaine, eldest son of Algernon Percy, 1st Earl of Beverley, a younger son of Hugh Percy, 1st Duke of Northumberland. From his father's succession as second Earl of Beverley in 1830, Percy was styled Lord Lovaine. In 1865, Lord Beverley inherited the dukedom of Northumberland from his first cousin, Algernon Percy, 4th Duke of Northumberland, and thenceforth Lovaine was styled Earl Percy. His mother was Louisa, daughter of the Hon. James Stuart-Wortley-Mackenzie, second son of Prime Minister John Stuart, 3rd Earl of Bute.

Lord Josceline Percy and Lieutenant-General Lord Henry Percy were his younger brothers.

Northumberland attended Eton College.

Political career
Northumberland sat in the House of Commons as Member of Parliament for Bere Alston between 1831 and 1832 and for Northumberland North between 1852 and 1865. He served Civil Lord of the Admiralty between 1858 and 1859 and as Paymaster-General and Vice-President of the Board of Trade in 1859 in Lord Derby's second government. The latter year he was also sworn of the Privy Council.

In 1867 he succeeded in the dukedom on the death of his father and entered the House of Lords. He joined the Earl of Beaconsfield's second government as Lord Privy Seal in 1878, with a seat in the cabinet, a post he held until the fall of the government in 1880.

Northumberland was also Lord Lieutenant of Northumberland between 1877 and 1899. He was made a Knight of the Garter in 1886.

Family
Northumberland married Louisa, daughter of Henry Drummond, in 1845. She died in December 1890. Northumberland survived her by nine years and died in January 1899, aged 88.  The Duke and his wife were buried in the Percy family vault in Westminster Abbey. He was succeeded in the dukedom by his eldest son, Henry, Earl Percy. Northumberland's second son Lord Algernon Percy was also a politician.

At the Percy seat Alnwick Castle, Northumberland, he enlisted Anthony Salvin to do considerable interior works in the neo-Gothic style, and purchased the collection of paintings amassed by the Roman painter Vincenzo Camuccini, to add to the pictures at Alnwick, swelled by the collection formerly at Northumberland House, The Strand, London, which was demolished in 1874.

References

External links 

 
 

|-

1810 births
1899 deaths
People educated at Eton College
Lovaine, Algernon George Percy, Lord
Deputy Lieutenants of Surrey
306
Knights of the Garter
Lord-Lieutenants of Northumberland
Lords of the Admiralty
Lords Privy Seal
Members of the Privy Council of the United Kingdom
Lovaine, Algernon George Percy, Lord
Lovaine, Algernon George Percy, Lord
Lovaine, Algernon George Percy, Lord
Lovaine, Algernon George Percy, Lord
Northumberland, D6
British landowners
Algernon Percy, 06th Duke of Northumberland
Burials at Westminster Abbey
19th-century British businesspeople